Hordubal is a Czech novel, written by Karel Čapek. It was first published in 1933. It compares internal and external knowledge. It is considered part of a trilogy with Meteor and An Ordinary Life.

Plot
Juraj Hordubal returns home to Carpathian Ruthenia after eight years of hard work in America. He is looking forward to seeing his devoted wife Polana and daughter Hafia. Everything is greatly idealised in his eyes as he expects everyone to welcome him warmly. However, the reality is different, he is accepted very coldly but hopes that things will get better soon and everyone will get used to his presence. He believes that Polana was a faithful wife during the time he was abroad. Unfortunately, he later discovers that she had an affair with the farm keeper Stepan Manya who was helping her with managing the farm.

The relationship between Hordubal and Manya becomes very tense and eventually, Manya is forced to leave the farm. That, however doesn't influence Manya's love affair with Polana. They still keep meeting despite the fact that Hordubal knows about the affair. Manya and Polana decide to get rid of Hordubal in order to begin a new life together. They are also motivated to do it as Hordubal's savings are big enough to ensure a convenient life for a long time. Hordubal is killed by Manya in the middle of the night. The ending of the book describes the investigation of the criminal act. All the evidence lead to Manya. He is sentenced to life. Polana is found guilty of planning the murder and is sentenced to 12 years in prison in spite of being pregnant. In the end, Polana's sinning is considered much more severe as she misused her husband's kindness and devotion and was unfaithful. The highly religious society detests her for her sins.

Film adaptations
There have been two film adaptations:

 Hordubalové (1937), directed by Martin Frič
 Hordubal (1979), directed by Jaroslav Balík

References

1933 Czech novels
Works by Karel Čapek
Carpathian Ruthenia in fiction